The Water's Edge Festival is a 25-hour continuous music festival held on the shores of Lafarge Lake and at the Evergreen Cultural Centre in Coquitlam, British Columbia. The around-the-clock event features hundreds of world music, jazz and traditional performers playing at up to seven different venues, as well as workshops, a lantern procession, and a midnight drum circle.

The inaugural event took place on the same weekend as Coquitlam's Festival du Bois. The 2010 festival was moved two weeks later to avoid the conflict and decrease the chance for colder weather that hit in 2009.

References

External links
 Official Site

Culture of Coquitlam
Music festivals in Vancouver
Music festivals established in 2009
2009 establishments in British Columbia